Vysokoye is a rural locality (a selo) in Novochesnokovsky Selsoviet of Mikhaylovsky District, Amur Oblast, Russia. The population was 4 as of 2018. There is 1 street.

Geography 
Vysokoye is located between Kupriyanikha and Raychikha rivers, 39 km east of Poyarkovo (the district's administrative centre) by road. Novochesnokovo is the nearest rural locality.

References 

Rural localities in Mikhaylovsky District, Amur Oblast